Benjamin van Wanrooy (born 4 September 1990) is a Dutch footballer who plays as a defender for Derde Divisie club SteDoCo.

External links
 Voetbal International

1990 births
Living people
Dutch footballers
NAC Breda players
SteDoCo players
Eredivisie players
Footballers from Breda
Association football defenders
Dutch expatriate footballers
Expatriate footballers in Belgium